Reading, Writing and Arithmetic is the debut studio album by English alternative rock band the Sundays. It was released in 1990 on Rough Trade Records in the United Kingdom, and on DGC Records in the United States. The album's title is a reference to the band's hometown, Reading, Berkshire.

Reception
Pitchfork ranked at number 15 on their list of "The 30 Best Dream Pop Albums". The same magazine named it on their list of "The 25 Best Indie Pop Albums of the ’90s", saying "Harriet Wheeler sings like she's trying to get the librarian's attention without disturbing others, and guitarist David Gavurin strums with a studied focus. A buoyant collection of jangly guitar riffs, hazy stories, and dream-pop crescendos." Ira Robbins of Rolling Stone called it "a collection of uncommonly good songs graced by Harriet Wheeler's wondrous singing. While her band mates play with shimmering economy".

Track listing
All songs written by David Gavurin and Harriet Wheeler.

 "Skin & Bones" – 4:16
 "Here's Where the Story Ends" – 3:54
 "Can't Be Sure" – 3:22
 "I Won" – 4:23
 "Hideous Towns" – 3:46
 "You're Not the Only One I Know" – 3:50
 "A Certain Someone" – 4:25
 "I Kicked a Boy" – 2:16
 "My Finest Hour" – 3:59
 "Joy" – 4:10

Personnel
 Harriet Wheeler – vocals
 David Gavurin – guitar
 Paul Brindley – bass
 Patrick Hannan – drums
 Lindsay Jamieson – tambourine

Charts

References

External links
 

The Sundays albums
1990 debut albums
Rough Trade Records albums
Geffen Records albums
Albums produced by Ray Shulman